The list of shipwrecks in 1995 includes ships sunk, foundered, grounded, or otherwise lost during 1995.

January

15 January

16 January

19 January

27 January

Unknown date

February

3 February

13 February

24 February

March

17 March

21 March

April

19 April

21 April

29 April

May

5 May

8 May

16 May

25 May

30 May

June

9 June

21 June

22 June

July

10 July

11 July

16 July

17 July

20 July

27 July

31 July

August

2 August

10 August

15 August

22 August

23 August

29 August

September

19 September

25 September

October

19 October

31 October

November

1 November

17 November

December

1 December

12 December

Unknown date

References

1995
 
Ship